BCR (Beijing City Rail) also known as Beijing Suburban Railway is a commuter rail service that connects urban Beijing with outlying districts beyond the reach of the city's Beijing Subway network. The suburban rail services run on existing China Railway lines.

The suburban rail services are managed by the China Railway Beijing Group, an agency of the Ministry of Railways that is not affiliated with the operators of Beijing Subway.

There are 4 suburban railway corridors currently in operation: Line S2, Sub-Central line, Huairou–Miyun line and Tongmi line.

In operation

History
 6 August 2008: Line S2 opened.
 21 December 2012: Line S2 (branch) opened
 1 November 2016: Line S2 (main line and branch line) — was diverted from Beijingbei (North) to Huangtudian.
 31 December 2017: Sub-Central line and Huairou–Miyun line opened.
 30 April 2019: Huairou–Miyun line — Yanqihu station (formerly known as Fangezhuang) opened, and the northern destination was extended to Gubeikou.
 20 June 2019: Sub-Central line — Eastern extension to Qiaozhuangdong (East).
 30 December 2019: Huairou–Miyun line — was diverted from Huangtudian to Qinghe.
 30 March 2020: Line S2 (main line) — shortened to Badaling railway station for Yanqing railway station renovation,  free shuttle bus is offered to Yanqing urban area.
 30 June 2020: Sub-Central line — Western extension to Liangxiang. Tongmi line opened.
 1 August ~ 20 August 2020: Huairou–Miyun line — whole line stop service for the Beijing–Tongliao railway electrification project.
 30 September 2020: Huairou–Miyun line — Southern extension to Beijingbei (North).
 1 December 2020: Line S2 (main line) — Yanqing railway station reopened.

Short-term planning

See also

 Beijing Subway

References

External links

Railway lines in China
Rail transport in Beijing